Talcher Autonomous College, Talcher, is a degree college offering instruction in Arts, Science and Commerce. 
it also offers Vocational Education in two trades and Elective subjects in Computer Science and Bio-Technology.

History
The college was founded as a Tutorial College in 1969, in a rented building overlooking the river Brahmani. It subsequently got approval and University affiliation for Intermediate in Arts (IA) from the session 1970-71,  The IGNOU authorities has chosen Talcher Autonomous College as a Special study Center in the year 2005 considering the demand of the local people.

References

External links

Department of Higher Education, Odisha
Autonomous Colleges of Odisha
Universities and colleges in Odisha
Angul district
Educational institutions established in 1969
1969 establishments in Orissa